Ghulam Mohiuddin is a male Muslim given name. It may refer to

Ghulam Mohiuddin Khan (died 1969), prince of Arcot (now in Tamil Nadu), India
Ghulam Mohiuddin (actor) (born 1951), Pakistani actor in Urdu and Punjabi films

Pakistani masculine given names
Arabic masculine given names